Open Knowledge Base Connectivity (OKBC)  is a protocol and an API for accessing knowledge in knowledge representation systems such as ontology repositories and object–relational databases. It is somewhat complementary to the Knowledge Interchange Format that serves as a general representation language for knowledge. It is developed by SRI International's Artificial Intelligence Center for DARPA's High Performance Knowledge Base program (HPKB).

External links
 Open Knowledge Base Connectivity Home Page

SRI International software
Knowledge representation